The Pittsburgh & Lake Erie Railroad Station, now Landry's Grand Concourse restaurant in Station Square Plaza in Pittsburgh, Pennsylvania, is an historic building that was erected in 1898. It was listed on the National Register of Historic Places in 1974.

History
The Pittsburgh & Lake Erie Railroad Station served as the depot for the passenger rail operations of the Pittsburgh & Lake Erie Railroad and the Pittsburgh depot from 1934 into the 1960s. Many of the trains making stops here were trains of the Baltimore and Ohio Railroad, which were making their way to Pittsburgh from Baltimore, Washington, Chicago, Detroit, and St. Louis.

In 1934, the B&O obtained trackage rights on the P&LE from New Castle  Junction to McKeesport and, until the discontinuance of its passenger service, used the P&LE station to reduce the amount of heavy-curvature trackage required to reach the original B&O station on the opposite side of the  Monongahela River.

The station closed in 1985 after the last commuter train to College Hill station was discontinued.
 
The Pittsburgh Station was listed on the National Register of Historic Places in 1974.

Long distance passenger trains
Noteworthy named trains of the B&O included in 1956:
 Ambassador (Detroit-Baltimore)
 Capitol Limited (Chicago-Washington)
 Cleveland Night Express (Cleveland-Baltimore)
 Columbian (Chicago-Washington)
 Shenandoah (Chicago-Jersey City)
 Washington - Chicago Express (Chicago-Washington)
 Washingtonian (Cleveland-Washington)

P&LE trains operating as New York Central trains:
 Pittsburgh-Buffalo Express (Pittsburgh-Erie-Buffalo, with sleepers to Toronto and Albany, eastbound)/Buffalo-Pittsburgh Express (Buffalo-Erie-Pittsburgh with sleepers from Toronto and Albany, westbound)
 Pittsburgh-Detroit Express (Pittsburgh-Detroit, westbound only)
 Steel King (Cleveland-Pittsburgh, with sleepers to Washington via the B&O's Washingtonian)

Gallery

See also

Grant Street Station
Union Station (Pittsburgh)
Wabash Pittsburgh Terminal
Baltimore and Ohio Station (Pittsburgh)

References

External links

 Article from Engineering News (1914) 
 Article from Railway Age (1902) with floor plan 

Railway stations on the National Register of Historic Places in Pennsylvania
Former Pittsburgh and Lake Erie Railroad stations
Neoclassical architecture in Pennsylvania
Railway stations in the United States opened in 1898
Railway stations closed in 1985
Railway stations in Pittsburgh
Former Baltimore and Ohio Railroad stations
City of Pittsburgh historic designations
Pittsburgh History & Landmarks Foundation Historic Landmarks
Historic American Buildings Survey in Pennsylvania
National Register of Historic Places in Pittsburgh
Former railway stations in Allegheny County, Pennsylvania